Suzanne "Suzy" Becker (born 1962) is an American author known for books such as All I Need to Know I Learned from My Cat.

Early life 
Becker graduated from Brown University in 1984 with bachelor's degrees in economics and international relations, and spent her first summer out of college biking 4500 miles across the United States. After a brief period as a second grade teacher at the American School of Barcelona, she moved to Boston, Massachusetts to start her writing career.

Career 
Becker is best known for her 1990 internationally bestselling book All I Need to Know I Learned from My Cat, which sold two million copies and spent 28 weeks on the New York Times bestseller list, with several at #1.

Becker began as an advertising copywriter in Boston. The job allowed her to hone her talents for insightful and irreverent writing, which would later become her trademark in her books and cartoons. In 1987, she founded her greeting card company, the Widget Factory, which garnered recognition for its humor, witty drawings, and corporate social responsibility. From 1987 until 1993, Becker worked as president, and owner of the Widget Factory greeting card line, creating over 200 different card designs, posters, and a maternity Advent calendar (which she invented).

Additionally, during that time, Becker also spearheaded national service projects, including, Ride FAR, the first U.S. HIV/AIDS bike-a-thon. Ride FAR, or the Ride for AIDS Resources, is a biannual event that gives 100% all proceeds raised directly to services for children and adults living with HIV/AIDS. To date, the ride has raised more than $1,100,000 for HIV/AIDS resources.

Becker eventually licensed the Widget Factory in early 1993, so that she could accept her appointment as a White House Fellow under President Bill Clinton from 1993–1994. Upon her return from her fellowship at the White House, Becker helped found and taught at the Francis W. Parker Charter Essential School, an alternative public secondary school in central Massachusetts. She left the school after a few years to focus on writing and illustrating full-time.

Becker's books include All I Need to Know I Learned from My Cat now in the "Double-Platinum Collector's Edition All I Need to Know I Learned from My Cat (and Then Some), My Dog's the World's Best Dog, Manny's Cows: The Niagara Falls Tale, an illustrated memoir about her own struggle and recovery from brain surgery entitled: I Had Brain Surgery, What's Your Excuse?, and a board book with teething corners for babies entitled Books Are for Reading.

Her most recent book Kids Make It Better is a write-in, draw-in world problem-solving journal for 6 -10-year-olds. The book features sidebar profiles of children under the age of 10 who have made a difference, observation logs and a "Make It Better" Action Plan.

Becker's work has appeared in various publications including Mademoiselle, Funny Times, The Best Contemporary Women's Humor, Grist.org, SEED, and The Boston Globe. Additionally, her work has been commissioned by the National Audubon Society, American Museum of Natural History, National Geographic Society, and the Environmental Defense Fund It has also been exhibited in solo and group shows throughout New England and New York, and is part of the permanent collection at the Museum of Comic and Cartoon Art. She illustrated the comic strip Rhymes With Orange while its creator Hilary Price was on vacation, June 9–14 and 22, 2008.

List of works 
 All I Need to Know I Learned from My Cat (1990)
 The All Better Book (1992)
All I Need to Know I Learned from My Cat- 1992 Calendar (1991)
 All I Need to Know I Learned from My Cat- 1993 Calendar (1992)
 All I Need to Know I Learned from My Cat- 1994 Calendar (1993)
 My Dog's the World's Best Dog (1995)
 There's a Cat in My Kitchen, Magnetic Kitchen Calendar- 2004 (2003)
 I Had Brain Surgery, What's Your Excuse? (2005)
 Manny's Cows: The Niagara Falls Tale (2006)
 All I Need to Know I Learned from My Cat (and Then Some). The Double-Platinum Collector's Edition (2007)
 Books Are for Reading (2009)
 Kids Make it Better (2011)
 Kate the Great, Except When She's Not (2014)
 Kate the Great: Winner Takes All (2016)

Awards/distinctions 
 New England Women Business Owners Woman of the Year (1992)
 Anti-Defamation League's A World of Difference Award for commitment to community service initiatives
 White House Fellowship (1993–1994)
 Bunting Fellowship from the Radcliffe Institute for Advanced Study at Harvard University (1999–2000)
 Work has been commissioned by the National Audubon Society, American Museum of Natural History, National Geographic Society, and the Environmental Defense Fund.

References

External links 
 Ride FAR Website
 Official Catster Page of "Binky" from All I Need to Know I Learned from My Cat
 Official Cat Channel Page of "Binky" from All I Need to Know I Learned from My Cat

1962 births
Living people
American women writers
American women illustrators
Brown University alumni
Harvard Fellows
HIV/AIDS activists
American LGBT writers
American health activists
People from Bolton, Massachusetts
21st-century American women